Şaban Kartal (1 January 1952 - 7 September 1998) was a Yugoslav-born Turkish former football player. His successful performance in Zonguldak Kömürspor resulted in his transfer to Beşiktaş. He won 1981-82 Süper Lig title in Beşiktaş .

On September 7, 1998, he committed suicide in his house in Ataköy, Bakırköy

Honours
Beşiktaş
Süper Lig: 1981-82

References

External links

 

1952 births
1998 deaths
1998 suicides
Suicides by hanging in Turkey
People from Veles Municipality
Sportspeople from Veles, North Macedonia
Turkish people of Macedonian descent
Turkish footballers
Turkey under-21 international footballers
Beşiktaş J.K. footballers
Kasımpaşa S.K. footballers
İstanbulspor footballers
Zonguldakspor footballers
Süper Lig players
Association football forwards